Akita Prefectural Central Park is a group of sports facilities in Yuwa, Akita, Akita, Japan.

Facilities

Akita Sky Dome
The dome is the practice facility for the Blaublitz Akita.

Prefectural Training Center Arena & Lodge
Stadiums
Ball parks
Baseball field
Tennis courts (20, Artificial turf)
Archery range
Training center
Cross-country skiing course
Barbecue square
Camping site

Gallery

References

External links

2001 World Games
Athletics (track and field) venues in Japan
Baseball venues in Japan
Blaublitz Akita
Buildings and structures in Akita (city)
Football venues in Japan
Saruta Kogyo SC
Sports venues in Akita Prefecture
Buildings and structures completed in 1983
Sports venues completed in 1983
Tennis venues in Japan
1983 establishments in Japan